Enson Shoji Inoue (born April 15, 1967) is a Japanese-American jiu-jitsu practitioner and retired professional mixed martial artist. A professional competitor from 1995 until 2010, he fought for the PRIDE Fighting Championships, the UFC, Shooto, and Vale Tudo Japan. He was the first and only Shooto Heavyweight Champion, and was a finalist in the Lightweight category at UFC 13. 

Born and raised in Hawaii, he has resided in Japan since the 1990s. He is sometimes known by the moniker "Yamatodamashii," a Japanese phrase meaning "the spirit of ancient Japan." His brother, Egan Inoue, is also a martial artist and a professional racquetball competitor.

Background
Inoue was born and raised in Honolulu, Hawaii to third-generation Japanese immigrant parents, making him a Yonsei (fourth-generation Japanese-American). He attended University High School, and began practicing the martial arts Hapkido and Taekwondo in order to defend himself from bullies. Inoue also played Football, Baseball, Basketball, Volleyball, ran in track and field, and also excelled in racquetball, alongside his brother Egan. 

Inoue began learning Gracie Brazilian jiu-jitsu.  He and his brother were awarded black belts in Brazilian Jiu-Jitsu by John Lewis. He subsequently demoted himself to purple belt in July 2016 citing that BJJ has moved on since attaining his black belt. He also holds a yondan (fourth degree black belt) in Bujinkan Budo Taijutsu..

Mixed martial career
Inoue competed professionally from 1995 to 2010, retiring with a 12-8-0 record. 

His first professional bout was against Shingo Shigeta at Shooto: Vale Tudo Access 3 on January 21, 1995, which ended in a victory by total knockout.  He won the Shooto Heavyweight Champion against Joe Estes at Shooto: Reconquista 4, on October 12, 1997.

His other achievements include a victory over UFC Hall of Famer Randy Couture, and giving Frank Shamrock one of his toughest matches. His final bout was against Antz Nansen on April 25, 2010 in Tokyo, which he won by submission.

Other activities 
Inoue runs several MMA gyms located in Japan, Saipan, and Guam under the name Purebred. He also has affiliated gyms located in Thailand, Canada and the USA.

He appeared in the 2008 martial arts film Redbelt as a cameo role, and was featured in the documentary film Rites of Passage: The Rebirth of Combat Sports.

Personal life
Inoue has a stepson (Erson) and is the brother of Egan Inoue, a mixed martial artist and a two time racquetball World Champion player. He was married to the sister of Ultimate Fighting Championship Bantamweight fighter Norifumi Yamamoto. He took in and trained Norifumi in mixed martial arts after an incident with the Yakuza. Enson has asserted that he is "not Yakuza" but admits to doing business with members of Yakuza.

In the aftermath of the 2011 Tōhoku earthquake and tsunami, Enson travelled to northeast Japan to directly help the victims.

In 2020, news broke that the IBJJF had refused to recognize Inoue's official rank as a BJJ black belt, despite him competing at the highest levels of the sport as early as 1999.

Enson is married to Sarah Jane McCann, who is from New Zealand of Māori descent.

Legal issues
In October 2008, Inoue was arrested in Tokyo for marijuana possession and spent 28 days in prison before being released on November 14, 2008. He was charged with a two-year suspended sentence with four years probation. During his probation period he was not allowed to leave the country.

Championships and accomplishments
Shooto
Heavyweight Championship (One time)
Ultimate Fighting Championship
UFC 13 Lightweight Tournament Finalist
ADCC Submission Wrestling World Championship
1999 ADCC Superfight Champion, Second Place

Mixed martial arts record

|-
| Win
| align=center| 12–8
| Antz Nansen
| Submission (armbar)
| Astra: Yoshida's Farewell
| 
| align=center| 1
| align=center| 2:10
| Tokyo, Japan
| 
|-
| Loss
| align=center| 11–8
| Tommy Sauer
| TKO (punches)
| SB 35: SuperBrawl 35
| 
| align=center| 1
| align=center| 4:14
| Hawaii, United States
| 
|-
| Win
| align=center| 11–7
| Soichi Nishida
| Submission (choke)
| FFCF 1: Fury Full Contact Fighting 1
| 
| align=center| 1
| align=center| 1:00
| Guam
| 
|-
| Loss
| align=center| 10–7
| Antônio Rodrigo Nogueira
| Technical submission (triangle choke)
| PRIDE 19
| 
| align=center| 1
| align=center| 6:17
| Saitama, Japan
| 
|-
| Loss
| align=center| 10–6
| Heath Herring
| TKO (knees)
| PRIDE 12
| 
| align=center| 1
| align=center| 4:52
| Saitama, Japan
| 
|-
| Loss
| align=center| 10–5
| Igor Vovchanchyn
| TKO (doctor stoppage)
| PRIDE 10
| 
| align=center| 1
| align=center| 10:00
| Tokyo, Japan
| 
|-
| Loss
| align=center| 10–4
| Mark Kerr
| Decision (unanimous)
| PRIDE Grand Prix 2000: Opening Round
| 
| align=center| 1
| align=center| 15:00
| Tokyo, Japan
| 
|-
| Win
| align=center| 10–3
| Soichi Nishida
| Submission (rear-naked choke)
| PRIDE 5
| 
| align=center| 1
| align=center| 0:24
| Nagoya, Japan
| 
|-
| Win
| align=center| 9–3
| Randy Couture
| Submission (armbar)
| VTJ 1998: Vale Tudo Japan 1998
| 
| align=center| 1
| align=center| 1:39
| Tokyo, Japan
| 
|-
| Loss
| align=center| 8–3
| Frank Shamrock
| TKO (punches)
| VTJ 1997: Vale Tudo Japan 1997
| 
| align=center| 2
| align=center| 7:17
| Tokyo, Japan
| 
|-
| Win
| align=center| 8–2
| Joe Estes
| TKO (submission to punches)
| Shooto: Reconquista 4
| 
| align=center| 1
| align=center| 1:06
| Tokyo, Japan
|
|-
| Win
| align=center| 7–2
| Royce Alger
| Technical Submission (armbar)
| UFC 13
| 
| align=center| 1
| align=center| 1:36
| Augusta, Georgia, United States
| 
|-
| Win
| align=center| 6–2
| Rei Zulu
| TKO (elbows)
| Shooto: Reconquista 2
| 
| align=center| 1
| align=center| 0:45
| Tokyo, Japan
| 
|-
| Win
| align=center| 5–2
| Mushtaq Abdullah
| TKO (submission to punches)
| Shooto: Let's Get Lost
| 
| align=center| 1
| align=center| 0:38
| Tokyo, Japan
| 
|-
| Loss
| align=center| 4–2
| Igor Zinoviev
| TKO (punches)
| VTJ 1996: Vale Tudo Japan 1996
| 
| align=center| 1
| align=center| 0:44
| Tokyo, Japan
| 
|-
| Loss
| align=center| 4–1
| Joe Estes
| Decision (majority)
| Shooto: Vale Tudo Junction 3
| 
| align=center| 3
| align=center| 8:00
| Tokyo, Japan
| 
|-
| Win
| align=center| 4–0
| Andre Mannaart
| TKO (punches)
| Shooto: Vale Tudo Junction 1
| 
| align=center| 1
| align=center| 3:20
| Tokyo, Japan
| 
|-
| Win
| align=center| 3–0
| Ed de Kruijf
| Technical Submission (armbar)
| Shooto: Complete Vale Tudo Access
| 
| align=center| 1
| align=center| 1:40
| Japan
| 
|-
| Win
| align=center| 2–0
| Rene Rooze
| Submission (rear naked choke)
| VTJ 1995: Vale Tudo Japan 1995
| 
| align=center| 1
| align=center| 6:41
| Japan
| 
|-
| Win
| align=center| 1–0
| Shingo Shigeta
| TKO (punches)
| Shooto: Vale Tudo Access 3
| 
| align=center| 1
| align=center| 1:10
| Tokyo, Japan
|

Submission grappling record
KO PUNCHES
|- style="text-align:center; background:#f0f0f0;"
| style="border-style:none none solid solid; "|Result
| style="border-style:none none solid solid; "|Opponent
| style="border-style:none none solid solid; "|Method
| style="border-style:none none solid solid; "|Event
| style="border-style:none none solid solid; "|Date
| style="border-style:none none solid solid; "|Round
| style="border-style:none none solid solid; "|Time
| style="border-style:none none solid solid; "|Notes
|-
|Win||Tully Kulihaapai || Submission (armbar) || PRIDE 7|| 1999|| 1|| ||
|-
|Loss||Mario Sperry || Points || ADCC 1999 Absolute|| 1999|| 1|| ||
|-

References

External links

 
 Official blog
 PRIDE profile
 
 Information on inoue grappling, I
 Information on inoue grappling, II
 NERDSociety - Interview with Enson Inoue
 Chris Leben interviews Enson Inoue
 Official Enson Inoue Tee KO Merch

1967 births
Living people
American male mixed martial artists
Japanese male mixed martial artists
Mixed martial artists from Hawaii
Light heavyweight mixed martial artists
Heavyweight mixed martial artists
Mixed martial artists utilizing ninjutsu
Mixed martial artists utilizing collegiate wrestling
Mixed martial artists utilizing Muay Thai
Mixed martial artists utilizing Brazilian jiu-jitsu
American ninjutsu practitioners
American practitioners of Brazilian jiu-jitsu
Japanese practitioners of Brazilian jiu-jitsu
People awarded a black belt in Brazilian jiu-jitsu
American Muay Thai practitioners
Sportspeople from Honolulu
American sportspeople of Japanese descent
Ultimate Fighting Championship male fighters